Cambridge Bay (Inuinnaqtun: Iqaluktuuttiaq) is a territorial electoral district (riding) for the Legislative Assembly of Nunavut, Canada.

The riding, which consists of the communities of Bathurst Inlet, Cambridge Bay and Umingmaktok, came into existence for the first Nunavut general election. The election, which occurred 15 February 1999, was held prior to division of the Northwest Territories and Nunavut, 1 April 1999.

Election results

1999 election

2004 election

2008 election

2013 election

2017 election

References

External links
Website of the Legislative Assembly of Nunavut

Electoral districts of Kitikmeot Region
1999 establishments in Nunavut